Trevor Deshawn Peters (born 19 March 1989) is a British Virgin Islander footballer who plays as a striker for Rebels FC.

International career
He made his debut for the British Virgin Islands in an October 2010 17–0 defeat to the Dominican Republic. Peters scored his first international goal in the 2–1 loss to US Virgin Islands on 10 July 2011.

Career statistics

International

International goals
Scores and results list British Virgin Islands' goal tally first.

References

External links

Caribbean Football Database profile
 Tabor Bluejays bio

1989 births
Living people
British Virgin Islands footballers
British Virgin Islands international footballers
British Virgin Islands expatriate footballers
British Virgin Islands expatriate sportspeople in the United States
Expatriate soccer players in the United States
Association football midfielders
Cloud County Thunderbirds men's soccer players
Tabor Bluejays men's soccer players
Rebels FC players